Beach of the War Goddess is the second studio album by British recording artist Caron Wheeler. The album was released on 23 February 1993 by EMI Records in collaboration with RCA Records.

Release and promotion
In collaboration with RCA Records, Beach of the War Goddess was released outside of Europe through EMI Records on 23 February 1993. The album spent five weeks on the Top R&B/Hip-Hop Albums' chart and peaked at number 81.

Singles
The album's lead single "I Adore You" was originally featured on the soundtrack to the film Mo' Money. "I Adore You" charted number 59 on the UK Singles chart and peaked at number 12 on Billboard's Hot R&B/Hip-Hop Songs' chart. "In Our Love" was released as the second single, peaking at number 61 on Billboard's Hot R&B Songs chart.

In August 1993, the album's third single "Soul Street" was released, but failed to chart. In September 1993, the fourth single "Beach of the War Goddess" was released and peaked at number 75 on the UK Singles chart.

Track listing

Charts

References

1993 albums
Caron Wheeler albums
RCA Records albums
Funk albums by English artists